The 28th Filmfare Awards were held in 1981.

Insaaf Ka Tarazu and Thodisi Bewafaii led the ceremony with 9 nominations each, followed by Aakrosh and Aasha with 7 nominations each.

Aakrosh won 6 awards, including Best Director (for Govind Nihalani), Best Actor (for Naseeruddin Shah) and Best Supporting Actor (for Om Puri), thus becoming the most-awarded film at the ceremony.

Rekha received dual nominations for Best Actress for her performances in Judaai and Khubsoorat, winning for the latter.

Main awards

Best Film
 Khubsoorat 
Aakrosh
Aasha
Insaaf Ka Tarazu
Thodisi Bewafaii

Best Director
Govind Nihalani – Aakrosh B. R. Chopra – Insaaf Ka Tarazu
Esmayeel Shroff – Thodisi Bewafaii
Hrishikesh Mukherjee – Khubsoorat
J. Om Prakash – Aasha

Best ActorNaseeruddin Shah – Aakrosh Amitabh Bachchan – Dostana
Raj Babbar – Insaaf Ka Tarazu
Rajesh Khanna – Thodisi Bewafaii
Shatrughan Sinha – Dostana
Vinod Khanna – Qurbani

Best ActressRekha – Khubsoorat Reena Roy – Aasha
Rekha – Judaai
Shabana Azmi – Thodisi Bewafaii
Zeenat Aman – Insaaf Ka Tarazu

Best Supporting ActorOm Puri – Aakrosh Amjad Khan – Qurbani
Girish Karnad – Aasha
Raj Kapoor – Abdullah
Shreeram Lagoo – Insaaf Ka Tarazu

Best Supporting ActressPadmini Kolhapure – Insaaf Ka Tarazu Ashalata – Apne Paraye
Dina Pathak – Khubsoorat
Rameshwari – Aasha
Simi Garewal – Karz

Best Comic Actor Keshto Mukherjee – Khubsoorat Asrani – Hum Nahin Sudhrenge
Deven Verma – Judaai
Deven Verma – Thodisi Bewafaii
Keshto Mukherjee – Be-raham

Best Story Aakrosh – Vijay Tendulkar
Aasha – Ram Kelkar
Insaaf Ka Tarazu – Shabd Kumar
Khubsoorat – D. N. Mukherjee
Thodisi Bewafaii – Esmayeel Shroff

Best Screenplay
 Aakrosh – Vijay Tendulkar

Best Dialogue
 Insaaf Ka Tarazu – Shabd Kumar

Best Music Director 
 Karz – Laxmikant–Pyarelal 
Aasha – Laxmikant–Pyarelal
Qurbani – Kalyanji-Anandji
Shaan – R.D. Burman
Thodisi Bewafaii – Khayyam

Best Lyricist
 Thodisi Bewafaii – Gulzar for Hazaar Rahein Mud Ke
Aasha – Anand Bakshi for Sheesha Ho Ya Dil Ho
Dostana – Anand Bakshi for Salamat Rahe Dostana
Karz – Anand Bakshi for Dard-e-Dil
Karz – Anand Bakshi for Om Shanti Om

Best Playback Singer, Male
 Thodisi Bewafaii – Kishore Kumar for Hazar Rahen Mudke Dekhi

 Abdullah – Mohammad Rafi for Maine Poocha Chand Se
 Dostana – Mohammad Rafi for Mere Dost Qissa Yeh
 Karz – Kishore Kumar for Om Shanti Om
 Karz – Mohammed Rafi for Dard-E-Dil
 Sargam – Mohammad Rafi for Dafaliwale Dafli Baja

Best Playback Singer, Female
 Qurbani – Nazia Hassan for Aap Jaisa Koi
Aap To Aise Na The – Hemlata for Tu Is Tarah Se
Grihapravesh – Chandrani Mukherjee for Pehchan To Thi
Pyare Dushman – Usha Uthup for Hari Om Hari
Qurbani – Kanchan for Laila O Laila

Best Art Direction
 Aakrosh  – C. S. Bhati

Best Cinematography
 Shaan  – S. M Anwar

Best Editing
 Insaaf Ka Tarazu  S. B. Mane

Best Sound
 Qurbani  – P. Harikishan

Critics' awards

Best Film
 Albert Pinto Ko Gussa Kyon Aata Hai

Best Documentary
 They Call Me Chamar

Biggest Winners
Aakrosh – 6/7
Khubsoorat – 3/6
Insaaf Ka Tarazu – 3/9
Qurbani – 2/6
Karz – 1/6
Thodisi Bewafaii – 2/9

See also
29th Filmfare Awards
30th Filmfare Awards
Filmfare Awards

References

 https://www.imdb.com/event/ev0000245/1981/

Filmfare Awards
Filmfare